West Bogor (is one of the six districts (kecamatan) within the Bogor, West Java, Indonesia. The district covers an area of 23.32 km2, and had a population of 251,433 at the 2022 Census.Administratively it is divided into sixteen administrative village/Kelurahan

Demography

Religion

Urban Villages

References

Districts of West Java
Bogor